Cycling was one of the seven sports at the 2011 Commonwealth Youth Games in the Isle of Man from 9 to 11 September 2011. 10 events were scheduled to be contested, 5 for both boys and girls. Each Commonwealth Games Association could send up to four athletes per event. The age of participating athletes was limited to 17- and 18-year-olds only. This meant that for the 2011 Games athletes must have been born in 1993 or 1994 to be eligible to take part.

Medal summary

Road cycling
Men

Results

Men's time trial

The Men's time trial took place on 9 September 2011.

References

External links

2011 Commonwealth Youth Games events
2011 in road cycling
2011 Commonwealth Youth Games
2011 in cycle racing